Virginie Perizzolo Pointet (born 26 February 1990) is a Swiss road and track cyclist, who last rode for UCI Women's Team . Perizzolo Pointet has also represented Switzerland at international competitions, competing at the 2016 UEC European Track Championships in the scratch and 500-metre time trial events.

Major results
2015
3rd Omnium Genevois
3rd 500m Time Trial, Trofeu CAR Anadia Portugal

References

External links

1990 births
Living people
Swiss female cyclists
Swiss track cyclists
Place of birth missing (living people)
21st-century Swiss women